John Maxwell, 1st Baron Farnham (1687 – 6 August 1759) was an Irish peer and politician.

He was the son of the Reverend Robert Maxwell and Anne Stewart, daughter of Colonel George Stewart. His paternal grandfather was Robert Maxwell, Bishop of Kilmore.

He was appointed Prothonotary of the Court of Common Pleas (Ireland) and held the office from 1725 until his death. He was a member of parliament (MP) of the Irish House of Commons for Cavan County from 1727 to 1756. He inherited Farnham estate from his cousin in 1737 and was appointed High Sheriff of Cavan for 1739. The latter year he was raised to the Peerage of Ireland as Baron Farnham, of Farnham in the County of Cavan.

He had married in 1719 Judith Barry, daughter of James Barry of Newton Barry and Anne Meredyth, and had the following children:
 Robert Maxwell, 1st Earl of Farnham, 2nd Baron Farnham (born  – died 16 November 1779 without male issue). (Earldom extinct, 1779)
 Barry Maxwell, 1st Earl of Farnham, 3rd Baron Farnham (died 7 October 1800). (Earldom restored, 1785)
 Rt. Rev. Henry Maxwell (died 7 October 1798) was Bishop of Dromore (1765–1766) and Bishop of Meath (1766–1798). He married in 1759 Margaret Foster, daughter of the Rt. Hon. Anthony Foster, and sister of John Foster, 1st Baron Oriel. Their two sons, John and Henry, eventually succeeded as the 5th and 6th Baron Farnham.

He died in August 1759 and was succeeded in the barony by his son Robert. In 1760 Robert was created Viscount Farnham and three years later created Earl of Farnham.

References 

Kidd, Charles, Williamson, David (editors). Debrett's Peerage and Baronetage (1990 edition). New York: St Martin's Press, 1990.
 
 Maxwell family genealogy, part 03, showing the Maxwell of Calderwood, Maxwell of Farnham (co. Cavan), and Maxwell of Finnebrogue families.

External links 
 Cavan County Museum – The Farnham Gallery
 Farnham Estate

1687 births
1759 deaths
Irish MPs 1727–1760
Members of the Parliament of Ireland (pre-1801) for County Cavan constituencies
High Sheriffs of Cavan
1
Peers of Ireland created by George II